Big Arm is a census-designated place (CDP) in Lake County, Montana, United States. The population was 177 at the 2010 census, up from 131 in 2000.

The town is situated on the south side of Big Arm, a large bay on Flathead Lake, hence its name. The name was used by the Kootenai people, who lived there prior to the town being established. The post office opened in 1911, with Marion F. Lamb as postmaster.

Big Arm State Park is located just north of the town.

Geography
Big Arm is located in northwestern Lake County at  (47.802296, -114.280952). The census-designated place contains the settlement of Big Arm along the southern shore of Flathead Lake's Big Arm, as well as undeveloped grassland to the south, up to the base of an unnamed  mountain. The CDP is bordered to the northeast by the community of Lindisfarne.

U.S. Route 93 passes through Big Arm, running just south of the lake shore. The highway leads southeast  to Polson, the Lake county seat, and northwest  to Elmo.

Climate
This climatic region is typified by large seasonal temperature differences, with warm to hot (and often humid) summers and cold (sometimes severely cold) winters.  According to the Köppen Climate Classification system, Big Arm has a humid continental climate, abbreviated "Dfb" on climate maps.

Demographics

As of the census of 2000, there were 131 people, 56 households, and 39 families residing in the CDP. The population density was 24.0 people per square mile (9.3/km2). There were 124 housing units at an average density of 22.8 per square mile (8.8/km2). The racial makeup of the CDP was 69.47% White and 30.53% Native American.

There were 56 households, out of which 23.2% had children under the age of 18 living with them, 53.6% were married couples living together, 8.9% had a female householder with no husband present, and 28.6% were non-families. 21.4% of all households were made up of individuals, and 7.1% had someone living alone who was 65 years of age or older. The average household size was 2.34 and the average family size was 2.60.

In the CDP, the population was spread out, with 19.8% under the age of 18, 9.2% from 18 to 24, 18.3% from 25 to 44, 29.8% from 45 to 64, and 22.9% who were 65 years of age or older. The median age was 47 years. For every 100 females there were 111.3 males. For every 100 females age 18 and over, there were 110.0 males.

The median income for a household in the CDP was $29,000, and the median income for a family was $38,750. Males had a median income of $16,750 versus $21,875 for females. The per capita income for the CDP was $16,620. There were no families and 8.0% of the population living below the poverty line, including no under eighteens and 30.0% of those over 64.

See also
 List of census-designated places in Montana

References

External links

Census-designated places in Lake County, Montana
Census-designated places in Montana